Sulcia is a genus of Balkan leptonetids that was first described by J. Kratochvíl in 1938.

Species
 it contains eight species and two subspecies:
Sulcia armata Kratochvíl, 1978 – Montenegro
Sulcia cretica Fage, 1945 – Greece (Crete)
Sulcia c. lindbergi Dresco, 1962 – Albania, Greece
Sulcia c. violacea Brignoli, 1974 – Greece
Sulcia inferna Kratochvíl, 1938 – Croatia
Sulcia mirabilis Kratochvíl, 1938 – Montenegro
Sulcia montenegrina (Kratochvíl & Miller, 1939) – Montenegro
Sulcia nocturna Kratochvíl, 1938 (type) – Croatia
Sulcia occulta Kratochvíl, 1938 – Bosnia-Hercegovina, Serbia
Sulcia orientalis (Kulczyński, 1914) – Bosnia-Hercegovina

See also
 List of Leptonetidae species

References

Spiders of Europe
Araneomorphae genera
Leptonetidae